A list of films produced in Hong Kong in 1971:

A-C

D-F

G-J

K-M

N-S

T-Z

References

External links
 IMDB list of Hong Kong films
 Hong Kong films of 1971 at HKcinemamagic.com

1971
Lists of 1971 films by country or language
1971 in Hong Kong